Warsy is a commune in the Somme department in Hauts-de-France in northern France.

Geography
Warsy is situated 22 miles(35 km) southeast of Amiens, just off the D329 road

Population

Places of interest
 The château of Warsy.  http://www.warsy.com/
 The nineteenth century church.
 The old public wash-house (no longer functioning).
 The Second World War memorial.
 An old school, not used since the 1960s.
 The mairie.

See also
Communes of the Somme department

References

Communes of Somme (department)